Klaus Badelt (born 12 June 1967) is a German composer, producer, and arranger of film scores. He is known for his collaborations with Hans Zimmer, helping to write scores for dozens of critically acclaimed films including The Thin Red Line, The Prince of Egypt, and Gladiator. Independently, he is known for his work on Hollywood blockbuster films such as Pirates of the Caribbean: The Curse of the Black Pearl, Equilibrium, K-19: The Widowmaker, Basic, and TMNT, and for his work in French and Chinese cinema as well as a number of films by Werner Herzog.

Life and career
Badelt was born in Frankfurt, West Germany. He started his musical career composing for movies and commercials in his homeland. In 1998, Oscar-winning film composer Hans Zimmer invited Badelt to work at Media Ventures in Santa Monica, California, his studio co-owned by Jay Rifkin. Since then, Badelt has been working on a number of his own film and television projects such as The Time Machine and K-19: The Widowmaker. He also collaborated with other Media Ventures composers, such as Harry Gregson-Williams, John Powell, and Zimmer; and mentored several others like Ramin Djawadi and Daniel Rojas (film composer).

While collaborating with Zimmer, Badelt contributed to the Oscar-nominated scores for The Thin Red Line and The Prince of Egypt, and wrote music for many well known directors and producers including Ridley Scott, Tony Scott, Terrence Malick, John Woo, Kathryn Bigelow, Jeffrey Katzenberg, Werner Herzog, Sean Penn, Gore Verbinski, Michael Bay and Steven Spielberg.

Badelt co-wrote and co-produced the score to Hollywood box office hit Gladiator, directed by Ridley Scott, along with Zimmer and singer/composer Lisa Gerrard. Having contributed music to Gladiator, Mission: Impossible 2 and Michael Kamen's score for X-Men, Badelt was involved in the three most successful movies in 2000. Badelt also collaborated with Zimmer on other successful films, such as The Pledge, and 2001 blockbusters Hannibal and Pearl Harbor. One of his more famous and popular scores was for the 2003 film Pirates of the Caribbean: The Curse of the Black Pearl.

In 2004, Klaus founded his own film music company, Theme Park Studios, in Santa Monica. Since then, he has scored films such as Constantine, Poseidon, Rescue Dawn, Premonition, and TMNT.

Among Badelt's most critically celebrated scores are the Chinese fantasy film The Promise and DreamWorks' remake of The Time Machine, the latter of which earned him the Discovery of the Year Award at the World Soundtrack Awards 2003. He also wrote the music for the closing ceremonies at the Beijing Olympics in 2008, and was commissioned to write an opera about China's First Emperor, to be premiered in 2015.

Klaus worked on the soundtrack for The Promise for almost 6 months. The song which can be heard in the movie's end credits is an ancient folk song in China, and very few people can still sing it. For that, Klaus traveled almost two weeks in China to find someone who was able to sing the whole folk song in order to rearrange it for the score.

Klaus founded the digital film distribution startup Filmhub to create a platform for content creators to list their titles and get deals with global streaming services. Under the leadership of Klaus and CEO Alan d'Escragnolle, Filmhub now enables thousands of filmmakers to directly distribute to more than 100 streaming channels such as IMDb TV, Tubi, Amazon Prime Video, and Plex. In 2021, Filmhub was recognized by Variety  as "a dynamic disruptor in the distribution space."

Filmography

Film

As score composer

As composer of additional music

Television

Other 

Beijing Olympics Closing Ceremony
MotorStorm: Apocalypse (video game)
Lords Mobile (video game)

Awards

References

External links
 
 
 
 Interview with Stumped Magazine
 Remote Control Fan Site
 ScoreNotes Interview

1967 births
20th-century German composers
20th-century German male musicians
21st-century German composers
21st-century German male musicians
German film score composers
German television composers
Living people
Male film score composers
Musicians from Frankfurt
Varèse Sarabande Records artists